The 1964 Lafayette Leopards football team was an American football team that represented Lafayette College during the 1964 NCAA College Division football season. Lafayette tied for last place in both the Middle Atlantic Conference, University Division, and the Middle Three Conference.

In their second year under head coach Kenneth Bunn, the Leopards compiled an 0–7–2 record. Douglas Dill and George Hossenlopp were the team captains.

At 0–4–2 against MAC University Division foes, Lafayette was one of three teams without a win in conference play, along with Hofstra, playing its first year in the division, and Lehigh, both of which finished 0–3–1. Lafayette went 0–1–1 against the Middle Three, losing to Rutgers and tying Lehigh.

Lafayette played its home games at Fisher Field on College Hill in Easton, Pennsylvania.

Schedule

References

Lafayette
Lafayette
Lafayette Leopards football seasons
Lafayette Leopards football
College football winless seasons